G. Rösler was a piano manufacturer in Česká Lípa, Bohemia.  His pianos bore his full name: Gustav Rösler, which appeared in Gothic script.

The owner Ludwig Gatter was awarded an imperial and royal warrant of appointment to the court of Austria-Hungary.

External links

References 

Companies of Czechoslovakia
Piano manufacturing companies
Purveyors to the Imperial and Royal Court
Musical instrument manufacturing companies of the Czech Republic